GP Wu (short for Gladiator Posse) was an American hip hop group consisting of four members, Pop Da Brown Hornet, Down Low Recka, Rubbabandz and June Luva. The group formed in 1993 and were one of the many affiliates of The Wu-Tang Clan.

All four members appeared on fellow Wu-Tang affiliate Shyheim's first two albums 1994's AKA the Rugged Child and 1996's The Lost Generation, with their first official appearance as a group being on the track entitled "5 Elements" from the latter. The group released their first and only album Don't Go Against the Grain in 1998 through MCA Records. The album met with little success and only reached No. 44 on the Billboard Top R&B/Hip-Hop Albums. Following the album, the group went their separate ways, with Pop da Brown Hornet being the only one to release a solo album, 2000's The Undaground Emperor.

Discography

References

Hip hop groups from New York City
MCA Records artists
Musical groups established in 1996
Musical groups disestablished in 1998
Musical quartets
Wu-Tang Clan affiliates